Santa Coloma is a parish (administrative division)  in Allande, a municipality within the province and autonomous community of Asturias, in northern Spain.

The population is 59 (INE 2011). The postal code is 33888.

Villages and hamlets
 Arbeyales Bendón (Arbiales)
 Bendón
 Bustel
 Cabral
 El Caleyo
 Is
 Llaneces (Llaeces)
 Meres
 Monón
 Muriellos (Murellos)
 Penouta
 Pontenova (A Pontenova)
 La Porquera (A Porqueira)
 El Rebollo (El Rebollu)
 El Sellón
 Vallinadosa (Valladosa)
 Santa Coloma (Santa Colomba)

External links
 Allande 

Parishes in Allande